2 Chronicles 2 is the second chapter of the Second Book of Chronicles the Old Testament of the Christian Bible or of the second part of the Books of Chronicles in the Hebrew Bible. The book is compiled from older sources by an unknown person or group, designated by modern scholars as "the Chronicler", and had the final shape established in late fifth or fourth century BCE. This chapter belongs to the section focusing on the kingship of Solomon (2 Chronicles 1 to 9). The focus of this chapter is Solomon's ascension and wealth.

Text
This chapter was originally written in the Hebrew language and is divided into 18 verses in Christian Bibles, but into 17 verses in the Hebrew Bible with the following verse numbering comparison:

This article generally follows the common numbering in Christian English Bible versions, with notes to the numbering in Hebrew Bible versions.

Textual witnesses
Some early manuscripts containing the text of this chapter in Hebrew are of the Masoretic Text, which includes the Aleppo Codex (10th century) and Codex Leningradensis (1008).

There is also a translation into Koine Greek known as the Septuagint, made in the last few centuries BCE. Extant ancient manuscripts of the Septuagint version include Codex Vaticanus (B; B; 4th century), and Codex Alexandrinus (A; A; 5th century).

Old Testament references
: 
:

Solomon gathers building materials for the Temple (2:1–10)
The section records Solomon's request to Huram (or "Hiram" in 1 Kings) the king of Tyre, who was a friend of David (verses 2–9), in which the skilfully structured message actually contains temple worship theology, establishing the temple as the second tabernacle (verse 3) with rituals as stated in the Torah (verses 4–5; cf. Exodus 30:1-8; Leviticus 24:5-9; Numbers 28-29 etc.) as the ground for the dedicatory prayer in 2 Chronicles 6:18. The man sent by Huram should be skilled in carpentry, as well as other crafts and works with various materials (verse 6; for examples, the curtain in 2 Chronicles 3:14), basically an equivalent of Bezalel and his assistant Oholiab, who constructed the tabernacle at Mount Sinai (Exodus 31:18). Solomon worked together with the Phoenicians in parallel with what David did (2 Samuel 5:11; 1 Chronicles 22:4).

Verse 4
Behold, I am building a temple for the name of the Lord my God, to dedicate it to Him, to burn before Him sweet incense, for the continual showbread, for the burnt offerings morning and evening, on the Sabbaths, on the New Moons, and on the set feasts of the Lord our God. This is an ordinance forever to Israel.
"Sweet incense": literally "incense of spices"
"Set feasts": or "appointed feasts"

Huram's reply to Solomon (1:11–18)
The salutation 'my lord' in verse 14 indicates Solomon's supremacy over Huram. Joppa (verse 15) was an important Israelite seaport (cf. Jonah 1:3; Ezra 3:7 about trading relations with the Phoenicians (Sidon and Tyre), mentioning Lebanese wood being transported across the sea to Joppa). According to 1 Kings 9:22 (cf. 2 Chronicles 5:29), Israelites were not employed as forced laborers, but the foreigners were (the same as in the time of David (1 Chronicles 22:2)

See also

Related Bible parts: Exodus 30, Exodus 31, Leviticus 24, Numbers 28, Numbers 29, 2 Samuel 5, 1 Kings 3, 1 Kings 9, 1 Chronicles 16, 1 Chronicles 22, Jonah 1, Ezra 3

Notes

References

Sources

External links
 Jewish translations:
 Divrei Hayamim II - II Chronicles - Chapter 2 (Judaica Press) in Hebrew and English translation [with Rashi's commentary] at Chabad.org
 Christian translations:
 Online Bible at GospelHall.org (ESV, KJV, Darby, American Standard Version, Bible in Basic English)
 2 Chronicles Chapter 2. Bible Gateway

02
Phoenicians in the Hebrew Bible